Temperance is an Italian modern melodic power metal band.

Biography
Founded in 2013 by musicians who have more than 10 years of experience in the heavy metal music scene, Temperance blends heavy guitars, metal riffs, electronic tracks and elements of folk music into melodic and powerful music. So far, they have released six full-length albums and a live DVD, released through Scarlet Records.

On 6 March 2018, Italian singer Alessia Scolletti announced via Instagram that she had officially joined the band after being a touring member for a while.

On 27 January 2023, Temperance released a statement confirming the departures of Alfonso Mocerino and Alessia Scolletti.

Band members
Current members
Marco Pastorino – lead guitar, clean and harsh male vocals (2013–present)
Luca Negro – bass (2013–present)
Michele Guaitoli – male vocals (2018–present)
Former members
Sandro Capone – clean male vocals, rhythm guitar (2013–2016)
Chiara Tricarico – female vocals (2013–2017)
Giulio Capone – drums, keyboards, composition (2013–2017)
Alfonso Mocerino – drums (2017–2023)
Alessia Scolletti – female vocals (2018–2023)

Timeline

Discography
Studio albums
2014: Temperance
2015: Limitless
2016: The Earth Embraces Us All
2018: Of Jupiter and Moons
2020: Viridian 
2021: Diamanti
Live Albums/DVD
2017: Maschere
Singles & EPs
2015: Me, Myself & I (single)
2021: Melodies of Green and Blue (EP)

Videography
2014: Breathe
2015: Me, Myself & I
2015: Save Me
2016: Unspoken Words
2016: A Thousand Places
2018: Of Jupiter and Moons
2018: The Last Hope In A World Of Hopes
2019: My Demons Can't Sleep
2020: Start Another Round

References

External links
temperanceband.com - Official website

2013 establishments in Italy
Italian power metal musical groups
Musical groups established in 2013
Musical quintets